The Rott is a river of Bavaria, Germany.

The Rott springs north of the district  of Großkarolinenfeld. It then flows next to Großkarolinenfeld and discharges near Rott am Inn from the left into the Inn.

See also
List of rivers of Bavaria

References

Rivers of Bavaria
Rivers of Germany